Àlex Carbonell Vallés (born 15 September 1997) is a Spanish footballer who plays as a central midfielder for FC Barcelona Atlètic.

Club career
Born in Sant Cugat del Vallès, Barcelona, Catalonia, Carbonell initially joined FC Barcelona's La Masia in 2003 at the age of six. He left the club in 2011 for UE Cornellà, but returned in 2013.

On 29 August 2015, while still a youth, Carbonell made his senior debut with the reserves by coming on as a late substitute in a 0–0 Segunda División B home draw against CF Pobla de Mafumet. On 21 November of the following year, shortly after being promoted to the B-side, he signed a new five-year deal with the club.

Carbonell made his first team debut on 30 November 2016, starting in a 1–1 away draw against Hércules CF, for the season's Copa del Rey. The following 27 July, he joined Segunda División side CF Reus Deportiu.

Carbonell left Reus in January 2019, after Reus was excluded from the LFP. On 31 January, he signed a short-term deal with fellow second division side Córdoba CF.

In March 2019, Carbonell agreed to a pre-contract with Valencia CF, being assigned to the B-team for the 2019–20 campaign. On 9 July, he moved abroad for the first time in his career after agreeing to a one-year loan deal with Eredivisie side Fortuna Sittard.

Career statistics

Honours
Barcelona
Copa del Rey: 2016–17

References

External links

1997 births
Living people
People from Sant Cugat del Vallès
Sportspeople from the Province of Barcelona
Spanish footballers
Footballers from Catalonia
Association football midfielders
Segunda División players
Primera Federación players
Segunda División B players
FC Barcelona Atlètic players
FC Barcelona players
CF Reus Deportiu players
Córdoba CF players
Valencia CF players
Celta de Vigo B players
Eredivisie players
Fortuna Sittard players
Swiss Super League players
FC Luzern players
Spain youth international footballers
Spanish expatriate footballers
Spanish expatriate sportspeople in the Netherlands
Spanish expatriate sportspeople in Switzerland
Expatriate footballers in the Netherlands
Expatriate footballers in Switzerland